IS-3 may refer to:

IS-3 ABC, a single-seat training glider designed and built in Poland
IS-3 (tank), a 1945 Soviet heavy tank
IS-3 standard, a standard for the Advanced Mobile Phone System

See also
 ISSS (disambiguation)
 IS (disambiguation)